Chowan is a variation of the name of the Chowanoke American Indian tribe in North Carolina. It may refer to:

Chowan, the original name of the USS Crusader
Chowan County, North Carolina
Chowan River, in Virginia and North Carolina
Chowan University, in Murfreesboro, Hertford County, North Carolina
Chowan River Formation, a geologic formation in North Carolina.

See also
 

pt:Chowan